Angela Harry (born April 12, 1963) is an American model, actress and voice actress.

Early life and career
Angela Harry was born in 1963 while her father, a colonel in the US Air Force, was stationed in Japan. Her mother was born in Korea. She has a younger brother and a younger sister. Harry was subjected to racial insults during school. Her family moved throughout the United States, back to Japan and then to Korea by the time she was six. During this time she took piano lessons and briefly ballet.

While working at Saks Fifth Avenue, Harry secured her first modelling job at the age of eighteen and went on to appear in several ad campaigns. After joining the Nina Blanchard Agency in 1984, Harry bought an apartment in Irvine.

In 1997, Harry played Jan Ors in Dark Forces II: Jedi Knight, who was modeled to look like Harry in subsequent appearances.

Personal life
Harry was briefly involved with a male model and writer whom she met in a club in Tokyo.

She enjoys gardening and goes to a gym most nights.

Filmography

Film

Television

Video games

References

External links
 

1963 births
Living people
American female models
American film actresses
American television actresses
American video game actresses
American voice actresses
American actresses of Korean descent
People from Fukuoka
21st-century American women